The Sibylle class was a class of five 32-gun sail frigates designed by Jacques-Noël Sané and built for the French Navy in the late 1770s. They carried 26 x 12-pounder guns on the upper deck and 6 x 8-pounder guns on the forecastle and quarter deck.

 Sibylle 
Builder: Brest
Begun: April 1777
Launched: 1 September 1777
Fate: Captured by the Royal Navy in February 1783, broken up in 1784

 Néréide 
Builder: Saint Malo
Begun: October 1778
Launched: 31 May 1779
Fate: Captured by the Royal Navy in December 1797, becoming HMS Nereide; retaken by the French Navy in August 1810, but destroyed at the Battle of Grand Port in December 1810.

 Fine 
Builder: Nantes
Begun: October 1778
Launched: 11 August 1779
Fate: Wrecked in Chesapeake Bay in November 1793.

 Diane 
Builder: Saint Malo
Begun: December 1778
Launched:  18 January 1779
Fate: Lost in a tempest on 17 March 1780 off St Lucia

 Émeraude 
Builder: Nantes
Begun: December 1778
Launched: 25 October 1779
Fate: Broken up in 1797.

Notes, citations, and references

Notes

Citations

References
 

 
Frigate classes